The Bradley Braves baseball team is the varsity intercollegiate athletic team of the Bradley University in Peoria, Illinois, United States. The team competes in the National Collegiate Athletic Association's Division I and are members of the Missouri Valley Conference.

Dozer Park

Dozer Park has been home to the Braves baseball team since 2003. The stadium is located in downtown Peoria, and is also home to the Peoria Chiefs.

Head coaches
Records are through the end of the 2018 season

See also
List of NCAA Division I baseball programs

References

External links